Pine Valley is a census-designated place in north-central Washington County, Utah, United States that lies approximately 45 minutes north of the county seat,  St. George.  It is located at the head of the Santa Clara River in the Pine Valley Mountains, and was settled in 1859. The population was 186 at the 2010 census.

Significant landmarks include the Pine Valley Ward Chapel of the Church of Jesus Christ of Latter-day Saints designed by shipbuilder Ebenezer Bryce in 1868 using the scheme of an upside-down boat.  Pine Valley Chapel is the oldest Mormon chapel in continuous use.

Demographics

As of the census of 2010, there were 186 people living in the CDP. There were 461 housing units. The racial makeup of the town was 97.8% White, 0.5% Black or African American, 1.1% American Indian and Alaska Native, and 0.5% Asian. Hispanic or Latino of any race were 4.8% of the population.

People
William W. Cluff

See also

 List of census-designated places in Utah

References

External links

 
Pine Valley Chapel at the Church of Jesus Christ of Latter-day Saints

Census-designated places in Utah
Census-designated places in Washington County, Utah
Populated places established in 1859
1859 establishments in Utah Territory